Ma Hang Estate is a public housing estate in Stanley, Hong Kong Island, Hong Kong. Formerly the site of Ma Hang Squatter Area, the estate is designed as "working village" and consists of five residential blocks completed between 1993 and 2000 for providing in-site rehousing for squatters. Stanley Plaza, Murray House and Blake Pier at Stanley are also the territories of Ma Hang Estate.

Lung Yan Court is a Home Ownership Scheme court in Stanley next to Ma Hang Estate. Formerly the site of Ma Hang Squatter Area, it has two residential blocks completed in 1993.

Lung Tak Court is also a Home Ownership Scheme court in Stanley near Ma Hang Estate. It was originally planned for rental housing, but it was later converted to HOS court for sale. it consists of four residential blocks completed in 2000. Owners who have paid the land premium may rent their premises out in the open market. Apartments in this area offers an attractive alternative to living in the more built up areas like Wan Chai or North Point because there is much more greenery and open spaces around and buildings in Stanley are low rises. It is considered to be very convenient because it is located right next to Stanley Plaza and to the transport interchange.

Houses

Ma Hang Estate

Lung Yan Court

Lung Tak Court

Politics
Ma Hang Estate, Lung Yan Court and Lung Tak Court are located in Stanley & Shek O constituency of the Southern District Council. It is currently represented by Michael Pang Cheuk-kei, who was elected in the 2019 elections.

See also

Stanley, Hong Kong

References

Stanley, Hong Kong
Public housing estates in Hong Kong
Residential buildings completed in 1993
Residential buildings completed in 2000